The 1993 FIBA Africa Championship for Women was the 12th FIBA Africa Championship for Women, played under the rules of FIBA, the world governing body for basketball, and the FIBA Africa thereof. The tournament was hosted by Senegal from December 18 to 28, 1993.

Senegal defeated Kenya 89–43 in the final to win their seventh title with both winner and runner-up qualifying for the 1994 FIBA Women's World Cup. Senegal later withdrew.

Draw

Preliminary round

Group A

Group B

Knockout stage

Semifinals

7th place match

5th place match

Bronze medal match

Final

Final standings

Awards

External links
Official Website

References

1993
1993 in Senegal
1993 in women's basketball
1993 in African basketball
International women's basketball competitions hosted by Senegal
December 1993 sports events in Africa